Meharia murphyi is a moth in the family Cossidae. It is found in Malawi.

References

Endemic fauna of Malawi
Moths described in 2013
Meharia